Biwott is a surname of Kenyan origin that may refer to:

Amos Biwott (born 1947), former Kenyan steeplechase runner and 1968 Olympic champion
Emily Biwott (born 1984), Kenyan road running athlete
Gideon Biwott (born 1964), retired Kenyan 400 metres hurdler
Nicholas Biwott (born 1940), Kenyan businessman and politician
Paul Biwott (born 1978(Kenyan marathon runner
Simon Biwott (born 1970), former Kenyan marathon runner and 2002 Paris Marathon winner
Stanley Biwott (born 1986), Kenyan marathon runner and 2012 Paris Marathon winner
William Biwott Tanui (born 1990), Kenyan middle-distance runner competing for Turkey as İlham Tanui Özbilen
Yusuf Biwott (born 1986), Kenyan middle- and long-distance track runner

See also
Kibiwott, related name meaning "son of Biwott"

Kalenjin names